Ortenburg may refer to:
 Ortenburg, Bavaria, a market town in Bavaria, Germany
 Ortenburg-Neuortenburg, state of the Holy Roman Empire
 Counts of Ortenburg, comital dynasty in the Duchy of Carinthia
 Burgruine Ortenburg, castle ruin in Carinthia, Austria
 Château de l'Ortenbourg, castle ruin in Alsace, France